Moshe Sanbar (March 29, 1926 – October 1, 2012) was an economist and Israeli public figure. He served as governor of the Bank of Israel during 1971–1976.

Sanbar was born in Hungary, surviving the Second World War as a prisoner at Dachau Concentration Camp. Following his immigration to Israel he became associated with economic research and gradually involved in the work of the Ministry of Finance. He was in charge of the state budget and served as a personal, professional consultant to ministers Levi Eshkol and Pinhas Sapir, acting for the latter in his post as Minister of Trade and Industry (1970–1971).

Sanbar was active in four main fields:
 Civil service – In his various capacities at the Ministry of Finance: Head of the research division (1958–1960), deputy director of the State Income Directorate (1960-3), head of the Budget Directorate and economic advisor to the minister (1963–1968). After retiring in 1968 he continued to consult minister Sapir. In 1971 he was appointed as Governor of the Bank of Israel for a period of five years. In 1977 he was appointed as chairperson of the Sanbar Commission on local authorities.
 Public sector – In various activities in the fields of education, culture, sports and science. He was for many years associated with Habima Theatre and the College of Management. In the late 1980s he began his involvement in benefiting Holocaust survivors, becoming world treasurer and the chairman of the executive in the Claims Conference.
 Academia – As a researcher and statistician in the Institute for Social Applied Research, becoming its deputy director. Later on he lectured at Tel Aviv University and the Hebrew University of Jerusalem. A research institute was founded in his honor at the College of Management.
 Private sector – Heading various financial and industrial institutes.

Biography

Early life
Sanbar was born as Gusztáv Sandberg on March 29, 1926, in Kecskemét, Hungary. In his youth he was active in various sports: table tennis, fencing, wrestling and soccer. As a competitive wrestler he was champion of the highschool league in Kecskemét. His high school studies ended upon the Nazi occupation of Hungary. In response to the removal of Jewish players from the various sport teams, Sanbar founded a national soccer league for Jewish players. Following the war he was a member of Hapoel movement.

In early June 1944, Sanbar was recruited to the labor battalions of the Hungarian Army. In October 1944 his unit was marched to the Austrian border and taken by train to Dachau concentration camp in Germany. His parents, Solomon and Margaret Sandberg, perished in 1944. His time in the camps was later recorded in his book "My Longest Year", translated to several languages and winning a literary prize from Yad VaShem.

Upon his liberation by the Allied forces in April 1945, Sanbar contracted typhus. Following his recovery he returned to Hungary and studied economy in Budapest University. He was active in HaOved HaTzioni movement and headed the emigrant training programs in Hungary. In March 1948 he left his studies and migrated to the British Mandate of Palestine, arriving to the newly founded State of Israel in May 1948.

Sanbar was drafted to the IDF and discharged after his injury in the 1947–1949 Palestine war in the battles of Latrun. His MA studies at the Hebrew University of economics, statistics and sociology were completed in 1953.

Professional work
Sanbar began working in 1951 as a researcher and statistician at the Institute for Social Applied Research headed by Louis Guttman. Four years later, in 1956 he became deputy director of the institute. He was a pioneer researcher in the fields of consumer economics and the division of income. His comprehensive research in the latter field served as a basis for a series of articles printed in The Economic Quarterly.

Leaving the institute in 1958 to work for the Ministry of Finance, he directed the research division of the Income Directorate (1958–59) and appointed as a professional deputy director of the directorate (1960–63). Between 1960 and 1971 he held high level functions in the Israeli Ministry of Finance, concluding as a financial advisor to Minister Pinhas Sapir and as the Director of Budgeting.

During these years Sanbar was involved with financial legislation and headed several government committees. On the subject of budget planning he was invited to advise the UN and later published his book titled Budget and Planning. These concluded his initiatives in the Budget Directorate including the presentation of an annual estimate on the effects of the budget proposal on various income groups. He also chaired the governmental Efficiency Commission aimed at improving the public service in both quality and production.

Through his work in the Ministry of Finance Sanbar promoted the development of industry and science, replacing governmental loans with research grants and by establishing the first scientific complexes nearby university campuses. In 1967 he completed the legislative process founding the Football pool and became its first chairman. He also sat on various boards of governmental corporations such as Mekorot and serving as chairman of El Al's Finance Committee.

Throughout the 1960s, Sanbar took an active part in leading several of the government's economic policies such as the 1962 devaluation, the 1965 recession and the 1970 "package deal" signed with the Histadrut. At the request of Prime Minister Levi Eshkol, following the Six-Day War he conducted the economic policies concerning the Palestinians, as well as the development of unified Jerusalem. In 1969, Prime Minister Golda Meir appointed him to draft a national plan dealing with settlement of refugees and compensations on abandoned properties.

In 1970 he was appointed Acting Minister of Trade and Industry, acting for Minister Sapir who remained active in his simultaneous appointment as Minister of Finance. He held this position for 14 months.

Governor of the Bank of Israel
Between 1971 and 1976 Sanbar served as Governor of the Bank of Israel. His actions during and after Yom Kippur War maintained a stabilized market. Following almost two decades of David Horowitz's tenure, he was instrumental in the modernization of the bank and the update of the existing Banking Law. For the first time, the central bank was given responsibility supervising the foreign exchange market, and devaluation of the Israeli pound were being done in relation to the currency basket instead of the American dollar. Further actions during his term included the foundation of the First International Bank and the dissolving of Bank Eretz Yisrael – Britain.

Sanbar sat in various forums of the International Monetary Fund and the World Bank. Two of his international initiatives gained fame: A Proposal for the establishment of an institution providing guarantees for the export of capital between developing countries (This was later adopted by the organization of Latin American states), and a plan for gradual sale and disposal of monetary gold under the supervision of the IMF.

Sanbar Commission
Despite leaving the civil service, in the years 1977–1981 he accepted Prime Minister Yitzhak Rabin's request to chair a governmental commission on municipal affairs. Chairing the commission as a volunteer, he examined the relations between the central and local governments. The work was concluded following 20 interim reports and its report submitted to Prime Minister Menahem Begin. Despite  its final product being supported by the Knesset and used as a textbook in higher education institutes, its recommendations were only partially executed.

Central recommendations in the commission's report called for: Increase in the independent income of local authorities, setting criteria for government support in the local government and the listing of standard services to be controlled by the local authorities and/or supported by the state budget. These were mainly objected by Finance Minister Yoram Aridor.

Private sector
From 1977 onwards, Sanbar held many duties in the private sector, as head of industrial and financial institutions: Electrochemical Industries, Atzmaut Bank for Mortgages and Development, Le Nacional Insurance, Zelon Ltd., MG Rubber Industries, Hadera Paper Factories, Solel Boneh and others.

From 1988 to 1995, Sanbar chaired Bank Leumi's board of directors and its subordinate banking firms worldwide, including the Africa-Israel Group and Bank Leumi for Investments. Throughout this time period he initiated the foundation of a local Bank Leumi in Hungary, the First International Palestinian Bank, and Teuza company for high-tech investments. Aside from his official role he dealt with various crises such as debts of the Kibbutz Movement, the Koor Industries affair, financial breakdown of Caesarea Carpets and Schiff Hotels, and others.

In the years 1992–2003 he was President of ICC Israel, on two occasions being appointed to serve as a member of the ICC's international executive in Paris.

In 1995 Sanbar began working as a financial consultant. He worked with Lev Leviev and Saul Eisenberg, also sitting on the board of directors of Fairchild Corporation and chairing the Rosenrauch Foundation in Zurich.

Public sector
Throughout the years Sanbar was active in voluntary work in cultural, educational and social organizations. A partial list of his public roles includes:

Sanbar held further positions in the public sector. In the years 1974–1979 he was the first President of the Association of Graduates in Social Sciences and Humanities. Over the years he was a member of the executive at Tel Aviv University and the Technion, also sitting on the board of trustees of the Hebrew University and public councils of other academic institutes.

Sanbar was a member of the executive at Yad Levi Eshkol. in the late 1980s he was appointed by the Israeli government to the President and Prime Minister Memorial Council.

In 2009 he was the closing name in the candidates list of Gil Party for the Knesset.

Work for Holocaust survivors
Since 1987 Sanbar has been active in various national and international organizations working for the benefit of Holocaust survivors. He was a founding member in 1987 of the Umbrella Organization for Holocaust Survivors in Israel and appointed as its chairman. Under his leadership, the organization became a leading partner in the struggle for improving the lives of holocaust survivors worldwide. In 2003 he was made Honorary President, and in the years 2011–2012 resumed the position of chairman.

In 1992, the organization was inducted to the Claims Conference in New York. Sanbar was made deputy chairman of the Claims Conference, and in 1996 appointed as its international treasurer. In 2002 he was elected as Chairman of the Executive of the Claims Conference and held this position until 2006. As a representative of the Claims Conference in his various duties, Sanbar was a member of the Swiss National Committee on Needy Holocaust Survivors, and in 1998 appointed o the International Commission on Holocaust Era Insurance Claims led by former Secretary of State Lawrence Eagleburger.

Academia and publications
Over the years Sanbar was a lecturer of statistics in the Hebrew University (1957–1961) and a lecturer on economic research and policy in the Higher School for Law and Economics (1959). At a later time he was made a visiting professor of economics at Tel Aviv University (1977–1979).

In the years 1972–1995 he served as chairman of the board of trustees of The College of Management Academic Studies. In 2003, the college honored him by establishing the Moshe Sanbar Institute for Applied Economic Research.

Sanbar authored many researches and articles on economic policy, taxation, division of income and other monetary issues. In 2010 his memoirs were printed in a Hebrew book titled Signed on the Bill: An Economist in a Political World. His experiences during the holocaust were printed in the book My Longest Year, translated to various languages and the recipient of the Yad VaShem Prize for 1955.

Recognition
He is the recipient of many awards and honors: Herzl Prize for his public activity (1973), Ministry of Interior Award for his special contribution to the municipalities in Israel (1986), the Special Humanitarian Award by B'nai B'rith Organization (1995), Honorary Doctorate by Bar-Ilan University (2000), Israeli Chamber of Commerce honor for lifetime achievements (2004), the Light Award by the Fund for the Welfare of Holocaust Survivors (2012), honorary citizenship of Metula (1973), distinguished citizen of Tel Aviv (2000), and many others.

In 2004 he was awarded the Order of Merit of the Republic of Hungary, the highest civil decoration bestowed in Hungary.

In 2011 he was made an honorary member of the European Shoah Legacy Institute, a title given to only six individuals including Czech President Václav Havel and Nobel laureate Elie Wiesel.

Death
Sanbar died on October 1, 2012, in Tel Aviv. He was buried the following day at Kiryat Shaul Cemetery. Among those who spoke during the service were Rabbi Israel Meir Lau, Julius Berman, Colette Avital, Rafi Eitan and others.

References

External links
 Moshe Sanbar on the Legacy of the Holocaust Survivors

1926 births
2012 deaths
Commander's Crosses of the Order of Merit of the Republic of Hungary (civil)
Dachau concentration camp survivors
Governors of the Bank of Israel
Hebrew University of Jerusalem alumni
Hungarian emigrants to Israel
Hungarian Jews
Israeli civil servants
Israeli economists
Israeli financial businesspeople
Israeli Jews
Israeli people of Hungarian-Jewish descent
People from Kecskemét
Burials at Kiryat Shaul Cemetery